Sarangadhara is a 1957 Indian Telugu-language historical drama film, produced by T. Namadeva Reddy, directed by V. S. Raghavan and K. S. Ramachandra Rao. It stars P. Bhanumathi and N. T. Rama Rao with music composed by Ghantasala. The film is based on the epic of the same name by Gurajada Apparao.

Plot
Raja Raja Narendra (S. V. Ranga Rao) rules the Andhra kingdom with Rajamahendravaram as his capital, his Queen Ratnangi (Santha Kumari), and his son Sarangadhara (N. T. Rama Rao). He has two ministers Singanna (Gummadi), a good Samaritan, Ganganna (Mukkamala) a diabolic person and Nannaya Bhattaraka (Mikkilineni) is his poet who is translating the Mahabharat into Telugu. Sarangadhara learns ethical & royal moralities with him and gains expertise in all fields. During that time, some riots arise in the kingdom. Raja Raja doubts Rangaraju, the ruler of Rangaseema, so, he sends Sarangadhara as an emissary along with his two friends Subuddhi (Chalam) son of Singanna, and Mandavya (Relangi) an entertainer. In the forest, he is acquainted with Chitrangi (Bhanumathi Ramakrishna) daughter of Rangaraju. Chitrangi loves him at first sight. Sarangadhara pacifies Rangaraju who is unhappy with his daughter's infatuation and leaves. Eventually, Raja Raja & Ratnangi get various portraits of princesses for Sarangadhara, they like Chitrangi and send the portrait of Sarangadhara. After seeing it, Chitrangi happily agrees to the proposal. But Sarangadhara rejects the alliance because he is already in love with Kanakangi (Raja Sulochana), the daughter of a king in their empire. Minister Ganganna plots by manipulating Raja Raja and tricks him into marrying Chitrangi. So, Raja Raja sends his sword, instead of him and performs the marriage. After the truth is revealed, Rangaraju decides to declare war but Chitrangi stops him and assures her father that she will avenge the disrespect towards her family.
	
In Rajamahendravaram, Raja Raja arranges a separate palace for Chitrangi and she lives assisted by her maids. She also keeps Raja Raja away on the pretext of special prayers and waiting for the opportunity to meet Sarangadhara. Through her maid Mallika (Surabhi Balasaraswathi), she learns that Sarangadhara is fond of pigeon games. Mallika befriends Mandavya and steals one of the pigeons. At the same time, Raja Raja goes hunting and Sarangadhara starts the pigeon game. Chitrangi throws the stolen pigeon, which attracts Sarangadhara's pigeon into her palace, and for it, Saragadhara enters her palace. Chitrangi tells him the reality of her wedding and reveals her love for him. But Sarangadhara denies her advances and leaves the place. In a hurry, he forgets his knife & shoes. Meanwhile, Raja Raja arrives and announces Sarangadhara's marriage & crowning ceremony. After that, he notices Sarangadhara's shoes & knife in Chitrangi's palace and he suspects him. Moreover, an envious Chitrangi provokes the king by lying that Sarangadhara has molested her. He immediately places an ordinance to chop off Sarangadhara's legs. Here Subuddhi & Mandavya reveal the truth and prove the Sarangadhara's innocence. By the time they reach Sarangadhara, it is too late. Chitrangi also arrives and blames Raja Raja for his sentence, saying that she has wholeheartedly married only Sarangadhara and committed suicide.

At that point, Lord Shiva appears in the form of a sage and regenerates Sarangadhara's limbs. Finally, the movie ends on a happy note with the crowning & wedding ceremony of Sarangadhara. A temple adorns the place where Lord Siva blessed Sarangadhara and is today known by the name Sarangadhareswara temple in Rajamandry.

Cast
P. Bhanumathi as Chitrangi Devi
N. T. Rama Rao as Sarangadhara
S. V. Ranga Rao as Rajaraja Narendra Chalukya
Relangi as Mandavya
Gummadi as Mahamantri Singanna 
Mikkilineni as Nannaya Bhattaraka
Mukkamala as Ganganna
Chalam as Subuddhi
Santha Kumari as Ratnangi Devi 
Rajasulochana as Kanakangi 
Surabhi Balasaraswati as Malathi

Soundtrack

Music composed by Ghantasala. Lyrics written by Samudrala Sr. Music released on H. M. V. Audio Company.

References

External links
 

1957 films
1950s Telugu-language films